In group theory, the normal closure of a subset  of a group  is the smallest normal subgroup of  containing

Properties and description 

The normal closure  is the smallest normal subgroup of  containing  in the sense that  is a subset of every normal subgroup of  that contains 

Therefore one can also write

Any normal subgroup is equal to its normal closure. The conjugate closure of the empty set  is the trivial subgroup.

A variety of other notations are used for the normal closure in the literature, including    and 

Group presentations 

For a group  given by a presentation  with generators  and defining relators  the presentation notation means that  is the quotient group  where  is a free group on

References 

Group theory
Closure operators